Francisco Gómez is a Venezuelan politician. He was governor of Bolívar state. In the 2008 Venezuelan regional elections he won 67% of the vote, against Andrés Velásquez' 30%. He was previously president of the Corporacion Venezolana de Guayana (CVG).

According to Venezuelanalysis.com, "While on the negotiation commission to resolve the 15-month-long dispute at Sidor, Rangel ordered the National Guard to fire on protesting Sidor workers."  In April 2008 Hugo Chavez ordered SIDOR to be nationalised.

Sanctions
Rangel has been sanctioned by several countries.

In November 2017, the Government of Canada sanctioned Rangel Gómez as being someone who participated in "significant acts of corruption or who have been involved in serious violations of human rights".

On January 6, 2018 the US Department of State issued sanctions against Francisco Rangel Gómez and 3 other officials of the Venezuelan government for their alleged links with corruption networks.

In March 2018, Panama sanctioned 55 public officials, including Rangel Gómez.

References

Living people
Governors of Bolívar (state)
United Socialist Party of Venezuela politicians
People of the Crisis in Venezuela
Year of birth missing (living people)
People of the 1992 Venezuelan coup d'état attempts